Sölvi Fannar (born Sölvi Fannar Viðarsson on April 26, 1971) is an Icelandic actor, producer, health counsellor, writer, multi sport athlete,  public speaker, musician, conceptual artist and poet. He studied acting at the Icelandic Film School. Fannar participated in TEDxLambeth 2019 as a speaker.

Filmography

Bibliography

See also 

 List of Icelandic writers

References

External links
 Official website
 Sölvi Fannar at the Internet Movie Database

Solvi Fannar
1971 births
Living people
Solvi Fannar
Solvi Fannar
Solvi Fannar
Icelandic strength athletes
Place of birth missing (living people)
Solvi Fannar
Adherents of Germanic neopaganism
Modern pagan writers